Almalyk, Almalıq, Almalik, or Almaliq is a Turkic adjective form of "apple". It may refer to:
 Olmaliq, formerly "Almalyk", city in Tashkent Province, Uzbekistan
 Almaliq, Xinjiang, a medieval city in the northwest of Xinjiang, China
 Almalıq, a village in Kalbajar Rayon, Azerbaijan